Lundevall is a surname. Notable people with the surname include:

Hugo Lundevall (1892–1949), Swedish swimmer
Lars Lundevall, Norwegian musician
Simon Lundevall (born 1988), Swedish footballer 
Svein Lundevall (born 1944), Norwegian civil servant

Surnames of Scandinavian origin